Atteva gemmata is a moth of the  family Attevidae. It was described by Augustus Radcliffe Grote in 1873 and is endemic to Cuba.

It is very similar to Atteva rawlinsi from Hispaniola but half its size. In Atteva gemmata the dots are reduced in number and connected to each other forming small, vertical, white lines.

Taxonomy
Both available names have been wrongly synonymised under Atteva pustulella (Walsingham, 1897) and reinstated as a valid species (Meyrick, 1914; Walsingham, 1914). However, it seems that both works were overlooked by John B. Heppner and W. Donald Duckworth (1983) and by Heppner (1984) who continued to follow Walsingham's synonymy.

External links
A review of the New World Atteva (Walker) moths (Yponomeutidae, Attevinae)

Attevidae
Endemic fauna of Cuba
Moths described in 1873